Micularia is a genus of fungi in the family Elsinoaceae.

References

Myriangiales